Yeot-gangjeong is a candy bar-like variety of hangwa (traditional Korean confection) consisting of toasted seeds, nuts, beans, or puffed grains mixed with mullyeot (rice syrup). In general households, they usually make and eat yeot-gangjeong during Korean holidays and Jesa. Or, it is made and sold as a winter snack and is usually eaten during holidays and feasts.

Preparation 
Use pine nuts as they are, split peanuts in two, stir-fry sesame seeds,  and perilla seeds, beans, and fry rice paste. Mix the ingredients prepared by melting sugar into honey and pour bean powder or oil on a large wooden or metal plate, spread it quickly when it is hot, and cut the wheat into the right thickness with the next knife. 

Pine nut, sesame, walnut, and peanut yeot-gangjeong are made of diamond-shaped or corrugated patterns, and rice paste yeot-gangjeong are recommended to be rounded to the size of a tennis ball.

Gallery

See also 
 Candy bar
 Dessert bar
 Gozinaki
 Sachima

References 

Candy bars
Hangwa